Archbishop of Melbourne may refer to:

 Anglican Archbishop of Melbourne
 Roman Catholic Archbishop of Melbourne